Adolfo Ibáñez Boggiano (1880–1949) was a Chilean businessman and former Minister of Public Works. He was the founder of the companies Compañía Comercial e Industrial Tres Montes S.A. (now Tresmontes Lucchetti) and Sociedad Comercial de Almacenes Ltda. (now Distribución y Servicio). Adolfo Ibáñez University is named for him.

References

Chilean Ministers of Public Works
Chilean people of Italian descent
20th-century Chilean businesspeople
People from Linares Province
1880 births
1949 deaths